Novaya Derevnya is a rural locality (a village) in Yermolkinsky Selsoviet, Belebeyevsky District, Bashkortostan, Russia. The population was 17 as of 2010. There are 3 streets.

Geography 
Novaya Derevnya is located 13 km northwest of Belebey (the district's administrative centre) by road. Adelkino is the nearest rural locality.

References 

Rural localities in Belebeyevsky District